Big Drum Small World is the first studio album from Johnny Kalsi and his students from the Dhol Foundation institute in London. It was released in 2001 by Shakti Records and produced by Johnny Kalsi.

Track listing
 "Eik Din"
 "Eik Din II"
 "Iridian"
 "Healing with Turmeric"
 "Shin the Mechanic"
 "Poseidon"
 "Seven Heaven"
 "TDF meets DCS"
 "Tere Bina" (featuring Natacha Atlas)
 "Big Drum Small World"
 "Colours of Punjab"
 "Drummer's Reel"

References

The Dhol Foundation albums
2001 albums